{{DISPLAYTITLE:C21H28O2}}
The molecular formula C21H28O2 (molar mass: 312.44 g/mol) may refer to:

 11-Dehydroprogesterone
 Demegestone
 Dydrogesterone
 Ethisterone, a progesterone hormone
 Guggulsterone
 Levonorgestrel
 Norgestrel, a progestin (Dextronorgestrel)
 Pregna-4,20-dien-3,6-dione 
 Tetrahydrogestrinone, an anabolic steroid
 Tibolone, a steroid hormone
 Δ4-Tibolone, a metabolite of tibolone
 Trimethyltrienolone
 7,8-Dihydrocannabinol